Liliana Giussani (born 27 April 1959) is an Argentine former professional tennis player.

Biography
Giussani, who comes from Córdoba, competed in two Federation Cup ties for Argentina, against the Netherlands in 1980 and Hungary in 1983, playing the doubles rubber in both.

Her best performance in a grand slam tournament came at the 1981 French Open, where she reached the third round. She featured three times in the mixed doubles main draw of the French Open with her brother Edgardo and had another brother, Gustavo, who also played on the professional tour.

See also
List of Argentina Fed Cup team representatives

References

External links
 
 
 

1959 births
Living people
Argentine female tennis players
Sportspeople from Córdoba Province, Argentina